Thomas Browne Henry (November 7, 1907 – June 30, 1980) was an American character actor known for many guest appearances on television and in films.

He was active with the Pasadena Community Playhouse and was the older brother of actor William Henry.

Selected filmography

 Hollow Triumph (1948) - Rocky Stansyck (uncredited)
 Behind Locked Doors (1948) - Dr. Clifford Porter
 Sealed Verdict (1948) - Briefing JAG colonel
 Joan of Arc (1948) - Captain Raoul de Gaucort
 He Walked by Night (1948) - Dunning (uncredited)
 Impact (1949) - Walter's Business Assistant (uncredited)
 Tulsa (1949) - Mr. Winslow (uncredited)
 Johnny Allegro (1949) - Frank (uncredited)
 House of Strangers (1949) - Judge (uncredited)
 Special Agent (1949) - Detective Benton (uncredited)
 Flaming Fury (1949) - Robert J. McManus (uncredited)
 Post Office Investigator (1949) - Lt. Contreras
 Bagdad (1949) - Elder (uncredited)
 Undertow (1949) - Police Capt. Kerrigan (uncredited)
 Samson and Delilah (1949) - Master of Exchequer (uncredited)
 Guilty of Treason (1950) - Hungarian Secret Police Col. Gabriel Peter [i.e. Peter Gabor]
 Captain Carey, U.S.A. (1950) - Art Dealer (uncredited)
 No Man of Her Own (1950) - Doctor at Hospital (uncredited)
 Father of the Bride (1950) - Stranger (uncredited)
 Shadow on the Wall (1950) - Judge (uncredited)
 The Asphalt Jungle (1950) - James X. Connery (uncredited)
 It's a Small World (1950) - Jackson
 The Next Voice You Hear... (1950) - Doctor (uncredited)
 The Skipper Surprised His Wife (1950) - Doctor (scenes deleted)
 My Blue Heaven (1950) - Tavern Proprietor (uncredited)
 Saddle Tramp (1950) - First Doctor (uncredited)
 Double Deal (1950) - Sheriff L.G. Morelli
 Mystery Submarine (1950) - Mr. Hagen (uncredited)
 Belle Le Grand (1951) - Prosecuting Attorney (uncredited)
 Mr. Belvedere Rings the Bell (1951) - Father Shea (uncredited)
 Little Egypt (1951) - Mustapha El Bay (uncredited)
 The Guy Who Came Back (1951) - Navy Doctor (uncredited)
 Saturday's Hero (1951) - Athletic Director Keppler (uncredited)
 Hoodlum Empire (1952) - Commissioner Mermant (uncredited)
 The Marrying Kind (1952) - Mr. Jenner (uncredited)
 Deadline – U.S.A. (1952) - Fenway (uncredited)
 The Atomic City (1952) - Projection Room Speaker (uncredited)
 Red Ball Express (1952) - Col. Carter (uncredited)
 Lovely to Look At (1952) - Prospective Investor (uncredited)
 Scarlet Angel (1952) - Jason Mortimer (uncredited)
 The Winning Team (1952) - Carlson Carlton - Lecturer (uncredited)
 Washington Story (1952) - Congressional Secretary (uncredited)
 O. Henry's Full House (1952) - Manager (segment "The Cop and the Anthem") (uncredited)
 The Prisoner of Zenda (1952) - Detchard (uncredited)
 Operation Secret (1952) - Brother Francis, a Monk (uncredited)
 Stars and Stripes Forever (1952) - David Blakely
 Ruby Gentry (1952) - Cotton Warehouse Owner (uncredited)
 The Lady Wants Mink (1953) - Mr. Swiss
 Julius Caesar (1953) - Volumnius
 Law and Order (1953) - Dixon (uncredited)
 The Robe (1953) - Marius - Physician (uncredited)
 The Veils of Bagdad (1953) - Mustapha the Wild
 Flight Nurse (1953) - Dr. Peterson (uncredited)
 Riot in Cell Block 11 (1954) - State Governor (uncredited)
 Sitting Bull (1954) - Indian Agent Webber
 The Violent Men (1954) - Mr. Vail (uncredited)
 Black Tuesday (1954) - Reporter at Electrocution (uncredited)
 A Man Alone (1955) - Maybanks
 Last of the Desperados (1955) - Pete Maxwell (uncredited)
 Toughest Man Alive (1955) - Dolphin
 D-Day the Sixth of June (1956) - Gen. Bolthouse (uncredited)
 The Leather Saint (1956) - Bishop Hardtke (uncredited)
 Earth vs. the Flying Saucers (1956) - Vice Adm. Enright
 A Strange Adventure (1956) - Criminal Attorney
 Fighting Trouble (1956) - Frankie Arbo
 The Power and the Prize (1956) - Paul F. Farragut
 Calling Homicide (1956) - Allen Gilmore
 The Desperados Are in Town (1956) - The Banker (uncredited)
 Hellcats of the Navy (1957) - Board of Inquiry Chief (uncredited)
 20 Million Miles to Earth (1957) - Maj. Gen. A.D. McIntosh
 Beginning of the End (1957) - Col. Tom Sturgeon
 Chicago Confidential (1957) - Judge (uncredited)
 The Brain from Planet Arous (1957) - John Fallon
 Domino Kid (1957) - The Doctor (uncredited)
 My Man Godfrey (1957) - Henderson
 Blood of Dracula (1957) - Mr. Paul Perkins
 Darby's Rangers (1958) - Major, Sutherland's CO (uncredited)
 Quantrill's Raiders (1958) - Griggs
 Showdown at Boot Hill (1958) - Con Maynor
 No Time for Sergeants (1958) - Senator (uncredited)
 Space Master X-7 (1958) - Prof. West
 The Case Against Brooklyn (1958) - Ralph Edmondson (uncredited)
 Wink of an Eye (1958) - Mr. Hix
 Screaming Mimi (1958) - Dr. Mapes (uncredited)
 The Thing That Couldn't Die (1958) - Galleon Capt. Fletcher (uncredited)
 How to Make a Monster (1958) - Martin Brace - director of 'Werewolf Meets Frankenstein'
 Johnny Rocco (1958) - Principal Farrington (uncredited)
 I Mobster (1959) - Udino's Attorney (uncredited)
 Say One for Me (1959) - Dr. Leventhal (uncredited)
 The Big Fisherman (1959) - Speaker (uncredited)
 The Real McCoys (1959) - Reverend Bascom (The Tax Man Cometh)
 Oklahoma Territory (1960) - Judge Parker (uncredited)
 I Passed for White (1960) - Dr. Merritt
 Wake Me When It's Over (1960) - 1st Investigating General (uncredited)
 Gunfight at Comanche Creek (1963) - Mike O'Bryant
 Airport (1970) - Prof. Charles Ruch - Passenger (uncredited) (final film role)

Selected television

References

External links

 
 

1907 births
1980 deaths
American male film actors
20th-century American male actors